Trichilogaster acaciaelongifoliae is an Australian bud-galling wasp from the family Pteromalidae that parasitises, among others, Acacia longifolia (long-leaved wattle, or Sydney golden wattle), which has become an invasive pest in several countries. T. acaciaelongifoliae has been introduced into South Africa in 1985 and into Portugal in 2015 as a successful biological control agent of A. longifolia.

References

External links 
 Trichilogaster acaciaelongifoliae at WaspWeb

Pteromalidae
Insects used for control of invasive plants
Biological pest control wasps